Bombay Mittayi is a Malayalam-language film directed by Umar Karikkad starring Vinu Mohan, Neelambari, Amar Singh and Sreenivasan in the lead roles. This film marks the acting debut of leading politician Amar Singh. This film also marks the entry of Bollywood actress Dimple Kapadia into Malayalam cinema. Sri Lankan actress Neelambari Perumal enters Indian Cinema through this film.

Plot
Bombay Mittayi tells the story of Suresh and Prathapan who would do anything to earn some quick money. They get involved in several activities such as exporting of snake venom, Nagamnaickyam and even silver owls. Suresh is a gifted singer. However, as fate would have it, his music has not helped him much in life. Sulaiman is much older to Suresh and has always indulged in petty fraudulent activities to make some quick bucks. Meanwhile, world-renowned Ghazal artist Mallika Mansoor is found to be murdered. The investigation points to Suresh and Sulaiman as the main culprits. Rehana who is Mallika's daughter sets up her own inquiry into the murder to find out the murderers. In the process she saves Suresh and Suliamnan from the clutches of Poocha Police.

Cast

Vinu Mohan as Suresh
Neelambari Perumal as Karthika
Sreenivasan as Prathapan
Sarayu as Prathapan's Wife
Atluri Venkat
Mukesh (Cameo)
Amar Singh as Mallika Mansoor 
Dimple Kapadia as Mallika Mansoor's wife
Harisree Ashokan as Sulaiman
Jagathy Sreekumar
Suraj Venjarammood
Jayan Cherthala
Salim Kumar
Mamukkoya
Bheeman Raghu
Atlas Ramachandran
Machan Varghese
Narayanan Kutty
Murugan
Kottayam Nazeer
Darsha
Kalpana
Shobha Mohan
Kanakalatha
Sona Nair

Soundtrack

The music of Bombay Mittayi is by Paris V Chandran. The lyrics are penned by Rafeeque Ahammed and Mukesh Lal. There are five songs in the film. The singers are K. J. Yesudas, G Venugopal, K. S. Chitra, Pradeep Palluruthy, Vithu Prathap, Ravishankar, Midhu Vincent, Geetha Jith and Jos Sagar.

References

External links
 Bombay Mittayi at OneIndia.in

Films scored by Chandran Veyattummal
2010s Malayalam-language films